John MacWhirter  (27 March 1839 in Slateford, Edinburgh - 28 January 1911 in London) was a Scottish landscape painter.

Biography
John was the third of four children. One of his elder sisters, Agnes MacWhirter was also a noted artist of still lifes. He attended a school in Colinton, and after his father's death was apprenticed to Oliver & Boyd, booksellers in Edinburgh. He stayed there for only a few months and then in 1851 enrolled at the Trustees Academy under Robert Scott Lauder and John Ballantyne (1815–97). He spent long periods sketching and studying nature outdoors. His first painting to be exhibited at the Royal Scottish Academy at age 14, was 'Old Cottage at Braid'. In 1880, he was made an Honorary Member of the Royal Scottish Academy. Exploring and painting abroad he visited Italy, Sicily, Switzerland, Austria, Turkey, Norway and the U.S.A. - the Alps being a great inspiration. He moved to London in 1867 and on 4 May 1893 was elected a Royal Academician.

MacWhirter specialised in romantic landscapes with a great fondness for trees, spending much time in the hilly countryside of Perthshire. Initially, under the influence of John Everett Millais, he experimented with the detailed images of the Pre-Raphaelites, but later adopted a more sweeping style. With John Pettie he illustrated Wordsworth's Poetry for the Young (Strahan, 1863). With Waller H. Paton and others, MacWhirter illustrated The Poetical Works of Edgar Allan Poe (Hislop, 1869).

Family

He married Catherine ('Katie') Cowan Menzies (b. 1843) in 1872, her brother-in-law the Rev. James McFarlan officiating. The couple lived at 1 Abbey Road, St. John's Wood in the 1870s, and had two daughters and two sons:

Agnes Helen ('Nan') *1873 who married the artist Charles Sims
Helen Agnes *1875 x Sydney Malcolm Baird
Ulric George *1878
Alan Gordon *1882 x Doris May Cook

MacWhirter has paintings in several British Collections including Royal Holloway University of London, Cheltenham and Derby Art Gallery.

Bibliography
MacWhirter, John Landscape Painting in Water-colour (London, Cassell), 1900
Sinclair, W. M. John MacWhirter, R.A. : his life and work (The Art Annual), 1903
MacWhirter, John The MacWhirter sketch book (Philadelphia, Lippincott), 1907; (London, Cassell), 1908

See also
 Western Cattle in Storm

References

External links

 
 Profile on Royal Academy of Arts Collections
 Biography of John MacWhirter (Victorian painter) includes a transcription of his obituary in The Times of January 30, 1911

1837 births
1911 deaths
Scottish landscape painters
Artists from Edinburgh
19th-century Scottish painters
Scottish male painters
20th-century Scottish painters
Alumni of the Edinburgh College of Art
Royal Academicians
19th-century Scottish male artists
20th-century Scottish male artists